This is an alphabetical list of fungal taxa as recorded from South Africa. Currently accepted names have been appended.

Fa
Genus: Fabraea Sacc. 1881 accepted? as Leptotrochila P. Karst., (1871)
Fabraea litigiosa Sacc. (sic) possibly (Roberge ex Desm.) Gillet 1886
Fabraea maculata (Lév.) G.F. Atk. 1951 accepted as Diplocarpon mespili (Sorauer) B. Sutton, 1980)

Genus: Farysia Racib. 1909
Farysia olivacea (DC.) Syd. & P. Syd. 1920 accepted as Farysia thuemenii (A.A. Fisch. Waldh.) Nannf., (1959)

Genus: Favolus Fr., (1828)
Favolus agariceus (Berk.) Lév. 1844 accepted as Lentinus arcularius (Batsch) Zmitr., (2010)
Favolus brasiliensis (Fr.) Fr. 1830 accepted as Favolus tenuiculus P. Beauv., (1806)
Favolus dermoporus Torrend ex Lloyd.(sic) possibly (Pers.) Lév. 1846 accepted as Favolus tenuiculus P. Beauv., (1806)
Favolus europaeus Fr. 1838
Favolus friesii Berk. & M.A. Curtis 1868
Favolus jacobaeus Sacc. & Berl. 1889
Favolus megaloporus Bres. 1912
Favolus moluccensis Mont. 1843 accepted as Royoporus spatulatus (Jungh.) A.B. De [as 'spathulatus'],  (1996)
Favolus multiplex Lév. 1844, [as 'multiple'] accepted as Favolus grammocephalus (Berk.) Imazeki,  (1943)
Favolus natalensis Fr. 1848
Favolus rhipidium (Berk.) Sacc. 1888 accepted as Panellus pusillus (Pers. ex Lév.) Burds. & O.K. Mill., (1975)
Favolus spathulatus Bres. (sic) possibly Favolus spatulatus (Jungh.) Lév. [as spathulatus],  (1844) accepted as Royoporus spatulatus (Jungh.) A.B. De [as spathulatus], (1996)
Favolus tenuiculus P. Beauv., (1806) reported as Favolus brasiliensis (Fr.) Fr. 1830, Favolus tessellatus Mont. (1843) [as tesselatus] and possibly Favolus dermoporus Torrend ex Lloyd.(sic)
Favolus tessellatus Mont. (1843) [as tesselatus] accepted as Favolus tenuiculus P. Beauv., (1806)

Genus: Favotrichophyton (Castell. & Chalm.) Neveu-Lem. 1921 accepted as Trichophyton Malmsten, (1848)
Favotrichophyton violaceum (Sabour. ex E. Bodin) C.W. Dodge 1935 accepted as Trichophyton violaceum Sabour. ex E. Bodin, (1902)

Fe
Genus: Femsjonia Fr. 1849 accepted as Ditiola Fr., (1822)
Femsjonia natalensis Cooke 1882;

Genus: Ferrarisia Sacc. 1919
Ferrarisia jasmini Doidge 1942 accepted as Palawaniella jasmini (Doidge) Arx & E. Müll., (1975)

Fi
Family: Fistuliniodeae*

Genus: Fistulina Bull. 1791
Fistulina africana Van der Byl 1928

Fl
Genus: Flammula (Fr.) P. Kumm. 1871
Flammula alnicola Quel. {sic} poaaibly (Fr.) P. Kumm. 1871
Flammula flavida Quel. (sic) possibly (Schaeff.) P. Kumm. 1871 accepted as Pholiota flavida (Schaeff.) Singer, [1949]
Flammula harmoge Karst. (sic) possibly (Fr.) Sacc. 1887
Flammula hybrida Gillet 1876, accepted as Gymnopilus hybridus (Gillet) Maire, (1933)
Flammula janus (Berk. & Broome) Sacc. 1887
Flammula sapinea Quel. (sic) possibly (Fr.) P. Kumm. 1871 accepted as Gymnopilus sapineus (Fr.) Murrill, (1912)
Flammula tilopus (Kalchbr. & MacOwan) Sacc. 1887 accepted as Pholiota tilopus (Kalchbr. & MacOwan) D.A. Reid, (1975)

Fo
Genus: Fomes (Fr.) Fr. 1849
Fomes albomarginatus (Zipp. ex Lév.) Cooke 1885, accepted as Skeletocutis albomarginata (Zipp. ex Lév.) Rui Du & Y.C. Dai, (2020)
Fomes annosus (Fr.) Cooke 1885 accepted as Heterobasidion annosum (Fr.) Bref., (1888)
Fomes annularis Lloyd 1912 accepted as Ganoderma australe (Fr.) Pat., (1889)
Fomes applanatus Karst (sic) possibly (Pers.) Fr. 1849 accepted as Ganoderma applanatum (Pers.) Pat.,  (1887)
Fomes australis (Fr.) Cooke 1885 accepted as Ganoderma australe (Fr.) Pat., (1889)
Fomes badius Cooke 1885 accepted as Phellinus badius (Cooke) G. Cunn., (1965)
Fomes caryophylli (Racib.) Bres. 1912, accepted as Phellinus caryophylli (Racib.) G. Cunn., (1965)
Fomes chilensis Cooke. (sic) possibly (Fr.) Sacc. 1888, accepted as Ganoderma chilense (Fr.) Pat., (1889)
Fomes conchatus (Pers.) Gillet 1878, accepted as Phellinopsis conchata (Pers.) Y.C. Dai, (2010)
Fomes connatus (Weinm.) Gillet 1878 accepted as Oxyporus populinus (Schumach.) Donk, (1933)
Fomes curtisii (Berk.) Cooke 1885, accepted as Ganoderma curtisii (Berk.) Murrill, (1908)
Fomes dialeri Bres. & Torrend [as 'dialerii'],(1905) accepted as Phellinus rimosus (Berk.) Pilát,  (1940)
Fomes durissimus Lloyd 1920 accepted as Fulvifomes durissimus (Lloyd) Bondartseva & S. Herrera, (1992)
Fomes endotheius Cooke (sic) possibly (Berk.) Sacc. 1888
Fomes fastuosus (Lév.) Cooke 1885 accepted as Phellinus fastuosus (Lév.) S. Ahmad, (1972)
Fomes focalis Cooke (sic) possibly (Kalchbr.) Sacc. 1888
Fomes fomentarius Kockx (sic) possibly (L.) Fr. 1849,
Fomes fulvus (Scop.) Gillet 1878
Fomes fusco-purpureus Boud.(sic) possibly Fomes fuscopurpureus Cooke [as fusco-purpureus], (1885)
Fomes geotropus (Cooke) Cooke 1885 accepted as Rigidoporus ulmarius (Sowerby) Imazeki, (1952)
Fomes glaucoporus Lloyd 1915 accepted as Perenniporia inflexibilis (Berk.) Ryvarden, (1972)
Fomes hemileucus(Berk. & M.A. Curtis) Sacc. 1885  accepted as Fomitella supina (Sw.) Murrill, (1905)
Fomes hornodermus  (Mont.) Cooke 1885, accepted as Perenniporia martia (Berk.) Ryvarden (1972)
Fomes igniarius Kickx (sic) possibly (L.) Fr. 1849 accepted as Phellinus igniarius (L.) Quél., (1886)
Fomes kermes Cooke (sic) possibly (Berk. & Broome) Sacc. 1888
Fomes leucophaeus (Mont.) Cooke 1885 accepted as Ganoderma applanatum (Pers.) Pat., (1887)
Fomes lividus Cooke (sic)possibly (Kalchbr.) Sacc. 1888, accepted as Truncospora livida (Kalchbr. ex Cooke) Zmitr., (2018)
Fomes lucidus Levss. ex Fr. (sic) possibly (Curtis) Sacc. 1888 accepted as Ganoderma lucidum (Curtis) P. Karst., (1881)
Fomes mastoporus (Lév.) Cooke 1885 accepted as Ganoderma orbiforme (Fr.) Ryvarden (2000)
Fomes mcgregori Bres. 1912 accepted as Fulvifomes mcgregorii (Bres.) Y.C. Dai [as 'macgregorii'], (2010)
Fomes melanoporus Cooke (sic) possibly (Mont.) Sacc. 1885, accepted as Nigrofomes melanoporus (Mont.) Murrill, (1904)
Fomes minutulus Henn. 1895, accepted as Perenniporia inflexibilis (Berk.) Ryvarden, (1972)
Fomes mundulus Wakef. 1936 accepted as Perenniporia mundula (Wakef.) Ryvarden, (1972)
Fomes niaouli (Pat.) Lloyd 1915 accepted as Phellinus rimosus (Berk.) Pilát, (1940)
Fomes nubilis Cooke var. albo-limbatus Kalchbr.(sic) possibly Fomes nubilus var. albolimbatus (Cooke) Sacc. 1888
Fomes oroflavus Lloyd 1915 accepted as Ganoderma australe (Fr.) Pat., (1889)
Fomes pectinatus (Klotzsch) Gillet 1885 accepted as Phylloporia pectinata (Klotzsch) Ryvarden, (1991)
Fomes pinicola Cooke (sic) possibly (Sw.) Fr. 1849 accepted as Fomitopsis pinicola (Sw.) P. Karst.,  (1881)
Fomes pseudosenex (Murrill) Sacc. & Trotter 1912
Fomes rimosus (Berk.) Cooke 1885 accepted as Phellinus rimosus (Berk.) Pilát, (1940)
Fomes robinsoniae (Murrill) Sacc. & Trotter 1912 accepted as Fuscoporia wahlbergii (Fr.) T. Wagner & M. Fisch., (2001)
Fomes robustus P. Karst. 1889 accepted as Fomitiporia robusta (P. Karst.) Fiasson & Niemelä, (1984)
Fomes salicinus Kirckx. (sic) possibly (Pers. ex J.F. Gmel.) Gillet 1878, accepted as Phellinopsis conchata (Pers.) Y.C. Dai, (2010)
Fomes senex (Nees & Mont.) Cooke 1885 accepted as Fuscoporia senex (Nees & Mont.) Ghob.-Nejh.,  (2007)
Fomes torulosus (Pers.) Lloyd 1910 accepted as Fuscoporia torulosa (Pers.) T. Wagner & M. Fisch., (2001)
Fomes umbraculum (Fr.) Sacc. 1888
Fomes vegetus Cooke (sic) possibly (Fr.) Fr. 1849
Fomes yucatanensis (Murrill) Sacc. & D. Sacc. 1905 accepted as Phellinus yucatanensis (Murrill) Imazeki [as yucatensis], (1943)
Fomes zambesianus (Lloyd) Sacc. & Trotter 1925, accepted as Amauroderma preussii (Henn.) Steyaert, (1972)
Fomes zuluensis Wakef. 1948 accepted as Fomitopsis zuluensis (Wakef.) Ryvarden [as zuuluensis],  (1972)

Genus Fomitella
Fomitella supina (Sw.) Murrill, (1905) recorded as Fomes hemileucus(Berk. & M.A. Curtis) Sacc. 1885

Fr
Genus: Fracchiaea Sacc. 1873
Fracchiaea heterogenea Sacc. 1873

Fr
Genus: Fumago Pers. 1822
Fumago vagans Pers. 1822

Fu
Genus: Fusarium Link 1809
Fusarium acuminatum Ellis & Everh., (1895) recorded as Fusarium scirpi Lambotte & Fautrey 1894
Fusarium aloes Kalchbr. & Cooke 1880
Fusarium angustum Sherb. 1915 accepted as Fusarium oxysporum Schltdl., (1824)
Fusarium argillaceum (Fr.) Sacc. 1886 accepted as Rectifusarium ventricosum (Appel & Wollenw.) L. Lombard & Crous, (2015)
Fusarium avenaceum (Fr.) Sacc. 1886
Fusarium avenaceum f. 1 Wollenw. & Reinking possibly Fusarium avenaceum var. volutum (Wollenw.) Wollenw. & Reinking, (1935) accepted as Fusarium avenaceum (Fr.) Sacc., (1886)
Fusarium baccharidicola Henn. 1908
Fusarium bulbigenum Cooke & Massee 1887 accepted as  Fusarium oxysporum Schltdl., (1824)
Fusarium bulbigenum var. blasticola (Rostr.) Wollenw. 1931 accepted as  Fusarium oxysporum Schltdl., (1824)
Fusarium bulbigenum var. lycopersici  (Sacc.) Wollenw. & Reinking 1930 accepted as  Fusarium oxysporum Schltdl., (1824)
Fusarium bulbigenum var. niveum (E.F. Sm.) Wollenw. 1931 accepted as  Fusarium oxysporum Schltdl., (1824)
Fusarium bulbigenum var. tracheiphilum (E.F. Sm.) Wollenw. 1931 accepted as  Fusarium oxysporum Schltdl., (1824)
Fusarium cepae Hanzawa 1914 accepted as  Fusarium oxysporum Schltdl., (1824)
Fusarium chlamydosporum Wollenw. & Reinking 1925
Fusarium ciliatum Link 1825
Fusarium coccinellum Kalchbr. 1875
Fusarium coccophilum (Desm.) Wollenw. & Reinking 1935 accepted as Microcera coccophila Desm., (1848)
Fusarium coeruleum Sacc.
Fusarium compactum (Wollenw.) Raillo, (1950) recorded as Fusarium scirpi var. compactum Wollenw. 1930
Fusarium conglutinans Wollenw. 1913 accepted as  Fusarium oxysporum Schltdl., (1824)
Fusarium conglutinans var. callistephi Beach 1918 accepted as  Fusarium oxysporum Schltdl., (1824)
Fusarium conglutinans var. majus Wollenw. 1930 accepted as  Fusarium oxysporum Schltdl., (1824)
Fusarium congoense Wollenw. 1916 accepted as Fusarium heterosporum Nees & T. Nees, (1818)
Fusarium congoense var. septatius Wollenw. 1924
Fusarium culmorum (Wm.G. Sm.) Sacc. 1892
Fusarium decemcellulare Brick 1908 accepted as Albonectria rigidiuscula (Berk. & Broome) Rossman & Samuels, (1999)
Fusarium dianthi Prill. & Delacr. 1899 accepted as  Fusarium oxysporum Schltdl., (1824)
Fusarium dimerum Penz. 1882 accepted as Bisifusarium dimerum (Penz.) L. Lombard & Crous, (2015)
Fusarium diversisporum Sherb. 1915 [as diversisporium]
Fusarium equiseti (Corda) Sacc. 1886
Fusarium equiseti var. bullatum (Sherb.) Wollenw. 1930 accepted as Fusarium gibbosum Appel & Wollenw., (1910) [1913]
Fusarium expansum Schltdl. 1824
Fusarium filiferum (Preuss) Wollenw., (1916) recorded as Fusarium scirpi var. filiferum (Preuss) Wollenw. 1916
Fusarium graminearum Schwabe 1839
Fusarium granulare Kalchbr. 1882 as granulari
Fusarium heterosporum Nees & T. Nees 1818
Fusarium heterosporum var. congoense (Wollenw.) Wollenw. 1931 [as congoensis]
Fusarium incarnatum (Desm.) Sacc. 1886
Fusarium javanicum Koord. 1907 accepted as Fusarium solani (Mart.) Sacc., (1881)
Fusarium javanicum var. radicicola Wollenw. 1931 accepted as Fusarium solani (Mart.) Sacc., (1881)
Fusarium lateritium Nees 1816
Fusarium lateritium var. longum Wollenw. 1916 accepted as Fusarium stilboides Wollenw., (1924)
Fusarium lateritium var. majus (Wollenw.) Wollenw. 1930 accepted as Fusarium lateritium Nees,  (1816) [1816-17]
Fusarium lini Bolley 1901 accepted as  Fusarium oxysporum Schltdl., (1824)
Fusarium lycopersici Bruschi 1912 accepted as Fusarium oxysporum Schltdl., (1824)
Fusarium moniliforme J. Sheld. 1904 accepted as Fusarium fujikuroi Nirenberg, (1976)
Fusarium moniliforme var. erumpens Wollenw. & Reinking 1925 accepted as Fusarium fujikuroi Nirenberg, (1976)
Fusarium moniliforme var. subglutinans Wollenw. & Reinking 1925 accepted as Fusarium fujikuroi Nirenberg, (1976)
Fusarium orthoceras Appel & Wollenw. 1910 accepted as  Fusarium oxysporum Schltdl., (1824)
Fusarium orthoceras var. albidoviolaceum (Dasz.) Wollenw. 1916 accepted as  Fusarium oxysporum Schltdl., (1824)
Fusarium neocosmosporiellum O'Donnell & Geiser, (2013) recorded as Fusarium vasinfectum var. pisi C.J.J. Hall 1903
Fusarium orthoceras var. longius (Sherb.) Wollenw. 1916 accepted as  Fusarium oxysporum Schltdl., (1824)
Fusarium oxysporum Schltdl. 1824,
Fusarium oxysporum f. 1 Wollenw.*
Fusarium oxysporum f. 7 Wollenw.*
Fusarium oxysporum f. 8 Snyder.*
Fusarium oxysporum var. aurantiacum (Link) Wollenw. 1931 accepted as  Fusarium oxysporum Schltdl., (1824)
Fusarium oxysporum var. cubense (E.F. Sm.) Wollenw. 1935 accepted as  Fusarium oxysporum Schltdl., (1824)
Fusarium oxvsporum var. gladioli Massey 1926 accepted as  Fusarium oxysporum Schltdl., (1824)
Fusarium oxysporum var. nicotianae J. Johnson 1920 accepted as  Fusarium oxysporum Schltdl., (1824)
Fusarium pallidoroseum (Cooke) Sacc., (1886) recorded as Fusarium semitectum var. majus Wollenw. 1930
Fusarium putaminum (Thüm.) Sacc. 1886
Fusarium redolens Wollenw. f. 1 Wollenw. possibly Fusarium redolens Wollenw. 1913
Fusarium reticulatum Mont. f. 1 Wollenw. possibly Fusarium reticulatum Mont. 1843
Fusarium roseum Kalchbr. (sic) possibly Link 1809
Fusarium sambucinum Fuckel 1870 accepted as Fusarium roseum Link, (1809)
Fusarium sambucinum f. 2 Wollenw. probably accepted as Fusarium roseum Link, (1809)
Fusarium sambucinum f. 6 Wollenw. probably accepted as Fusarium roseum Link, (1809)
Fusarium scirpi Lambotte & Fautrey 1894 accepted as Fusarium acuminatum Ellis & Everh., (1895)
Fusarium scirpi var. acuminatum (Ellis & Everh.) Wollenw. 1930 accepted as Fusarium acuminatum Ellis & Everh., (1895)
Fusarium scirpi var. compactum Wollenw. 1930 accepted as Fusarium compactum (Wollenw.) Raillo, (1950)
Fusarium scirpi var. filiferum (Preuss) Wollenw. 1916 accepted as Fusarium filiferum (Preuss) Wollenw., (1916)
Fusarium semitectum var. majus Wollenw. 1930 accepted as Fusarium pallidoroseum (Cooke) Sacc., (1886)
Fusarium solani Appel & Wollenw. (sic)(Mart.) Sacc. 1881
Fusarium solani var. martii f. 1 Wollenw. possibly (Appel & Wollenw.) Wollenw. 1930 accepted as F solani (Mart.) Sacc. 1881
Fusarium solani var. martii f. 2 Snyder**
Fusarium sporotrichioides Sherb. 1915
Fusarium stilboides Wollenw. 1924
Fusarium vasinfectum G.F. Atk. 1892 accepted as Fusarium oxysporum Schltdl., (1824)
Fusarium vasinfectum f. 2 Wollenw. & Reinking**
Fusarium vasinfectum var. lutulatum (Sherb.) Wollenw. 1930 accepted as Fusarium oxysporum Schltdl., (1824)
Fusarium vasinfectum var. pisi C.J.J. Hall 1903 accepted as Fusarium neocosmosporiellum O'Donnell & Geiser, (2013)
Fusarium vasinfectum var. zonatum (Sherb.) f. 1 Wollenw. probably var. zonatum (Sherb.) Wollenw. 1930 accepted as Fusarium oxysporum Schltdl., (1824)
Fusarium vasinfectum var. zonatum f. 2 Wollenw.**
Fusarium sp.

Genus: Fusella Sacc. 1886
Fusella zambeziana Torrend 1914 [as zambesiana]

Genus: Fusicladium Bonord. 1851 accepted as Venturia Sacc., (1882)
Fusicladium crataegi Aderh. 1902 accepted as Venturia crataegi Aderh., (1902)
Fusicladium dendriticum (Wallr.) Fuckel 1870 accepted as Venturia inaequalis (Cooke) G. Winter, (1875)
Fusicladium dendriticum var. eriobotryae Scalia 1901 accepted as Venturia inaequalis (Cooke) G. Winter, (1875)
Fusicladium eriobotryae (Cavara) Sacc. 1892 accepted as Fusicladium pyracanthae (Thüm.) O. Rostr., (1912)
Fusicladium fuliginosum Kalchbr. & Cooke 1880
Fusicladium pyrorum (Lib.) Fuckel [as pirinum],(1870) accepted as Venturia pyrina Aderh. [as 'pirina'], (1896)
Fusicladium pirinum var. pyracanthae probably Fusicladium pyrorum var. pyracanthae Thüm. 1877, accepted as Fusicladium pyracanthae (Thüm.) O. Rostr., (1912)

Genus: Fusicoccum Corda 1829,
Fusicoccum africanum Van der Byl 1927
Fusicoccum viticola Reddick 1909, [as viticolum] accepted as Diaporthe neoviticola Udayanga, Crous & K.D. Hyde, (2012)

See also
 List of bacteria of South Africa
 List of Oomycetes of South Africa
 List of slime moulds of South Africa

 List of fungi of South Africa
 List of fungi of South Africa – A
 List of fungi of South Africa – B
 List of fungi of South Africa – C
 List of fungi of South Africa – D
 List of fungi of South Africa – E
 List of fungi of South Africa – F
 List of fungi of South Africa – G
 List of fungi of South Africa – H
 List of fungi of South Africa – I
 List of fungi of South Africa – J
 List of fungi of South Africa – K
 List of fungi of South Africa – L
 List of fungi of South Africa – M
 List of fungi of South Africa – N
 List of fungi of South Africa – O
 List of fungi of South Africa – P
 List of fungi of South Africa – Q
 List of fungi of South Africa – R
 List of fungi of South Africa – S
 List of fungi of South Africa – T
 List of fungi of South Africa – U
 List of fungi of South Africa – V
 List of fungi of South Africa – W
 List of fungi of South Africa – X
 List of fungi of South Africa – Y
 List of fungi of South Africa – Z

References

Sources

Further reading
 

Fungi
Fungi F
South Africa